Browning is the process of partially cooking the surface of meat to develop its flavor through various browning reactions and give it a more attractive color.

It is a common first step in cooking braised meats and stews.

Techniques
Browning is typically done using a frying pan, which is generally preheated to a medium high temperature to avoid sticking. In order to brown properly, the meat should first have surface moisture removed. This is usually achieved by patting the meat with a paper towel to remove water.

Ground meat is frequently browned before adding other ingredients, as when it is added to casseroles or prepackaged food products like Hamburger Helper, where the final cooking temperature will not be high enough to initiate the Maillard reaction. It is stirred during cooking to break it up and to promote even browning. Onions and seasonings are sometimes added. When the meat has reached the desired degree of brownness, the pan is removed from the heat and the excess fat is drained.

See also

Searing

References

Cooking techniques
Culinary terminology